Wiffle or Wiffle ball may refer to:

 Wiffle, a registered trademark of Wiffle Ball, Inc.
 Wiffle, a measurement the size of a Wiffle ball
 Wiffle ball, a sport similar to baseball or the ball used in the sport
 Wiffle Ball (video game)
 Buzz cut or Wiffle cut, a hair style

See also
 WFL (disambiguation)
 WIFL (disambiguation)
 WIFF (disambiguation)
 Waffle (disambiguation)